Dendrobium chameleon (chameleleon dendrobium) is a species of orchid of the genus Dendrobium. It is native to the Philippines and Taiwan. The size of the flowers varies from 2.5 to 3.75 cm.

References

External links 
 
 

chameleon
Orchids of China
Orchids of the Philippines
Plants described in 1908